Craig Stevens is an English radio and TV presenter, voice-over artist, and film critic. 

In 2007, Stevens presented ITV shows The Mint and Glitterball. His first presenting job was on Brainteaser. He has hosted his own radio shows on former East of England dance station Kiss FM (now Kiss 105-108) and former Essex & Suffolk local station SGR-FM, and used to present shows on Heart Cambridgeshire and now presents on  Star Radioacross Cambridgeshire. He spent some time presenting for ITV and is an anchor host for Sky Cinema interviewing film stars including Jim Carrey, Kristen Stewart, Steve Carell, Justin Bieber, and Jodie Foster.
 
Stevens has appeared on ITV's This Morning.

In 2016, he became a showbiz presenter on Channel 5's live Saturday morning magazine programme The Saturday Show and occasionally appears on ITV's Weekend. That year, he also presented When Gameshows Go Horribly Wrong on Channel 5. Stevens has also been a contributor on Channel 5's Most Shocking Celebrity Moments.

He is a regular host on the red carpet at London film premieres. Stevens has presented from the BAFTA red carpet, regular presenter on Ideal World and in the past has done stand-up comedy.

External links
 

British television presenters
Living people
British radio DJs
British radio personalities
English radio presenters
Year of birth missing (living people)